The Copa del Rey 1916 was the 16th staging of the Copa del Rey, the Spanish football cup competition.

The competition started on 26 March 1916, and concluded on 7 May 1916, with the final, held at the Camp de la Indústria in Barcelona, in which Athletic Bilbao lifted the trophy for the 7th time ever with a 4–0 victory over Madrid FC, with a hat-trick from Félix Zubizarreta. It was Athletic's third title in a row, thus gaining the right to keep the trophy. However, this tournament is best known for its El Clásico in the semi-finals which saw Madrid FC and FC Barcelona go head-to-head for the first time in 14 years in the competition's history, and the two sides were only separated after four thrilling matches including a dramatic 6–6 draw with extra-time and hat-tricks from the likes of Bernabéu and Alcántara.

Teams
 North Region: Athletic Bilbao
 Centre Region: Madrid FC
 South Region: Español de Cádiz
Galicia: Fortuna de Vigo
 Catalonia: FC Barcelona

Fortuna de Vigo (Champions of Galicia) and Español de Cádiz (Champions of Andalusia) withdrew before the draw.

Semifinal

First leg

Second leg

''FC Barcelona and Madrid CF won one match each. At that year, the Goal difference was not taken into account.

First replay

Second replay

Final

Notes

References
LinguaSport.com
RSSSF.com

1916
1916 domestic association football cups
Copa